Ryan Switzer (born November 4, 1994) is a former American football wide receiver and punt returner. Switzer played college football at North Carolina and was drafted by the Dallas Cowboys in the fourth round (133rd overall) of the 2017 NFL Draft. He was also a member of the Oakland Raiders, Pittsburgh Steelers, and Cleveland Browns.

Early years
Attended George Washington High School in Charleston, West Virginia, where he played on his high school football team, the Patriots. As a junior, he led the team in receiving and scored 12 total touchdowns (receiving, rushing and return combined), averaging over 110 yards all purpose yards per game for the No. 1 ranked team in the state. He finished his senior season with 206 carries for 2,379 yards and 32 touchdowns; he also caught 20 passes for 253 yards and four touchdowns and returned three interceptions for scores.

In addition to football, Switzer participated in basketball, helping lead George Washington to the 2011 AAA state basketball title as their starting point guard.

He was timed at 4.33 in the 40-yard dash, completed the 60-yard shuttle in 7.3 seconds and had a vertical leap of 34 inches. He committed to the University of North Carolina to play college football, and was drafted by the Dallas Cowboys.

College career

As a freshman at UNC (University of North Carolina in Chapel Hill) in 2013, Switzer led all NCAA major college players with an average of 20.9 yards per punt return. He accounted for five punt return touchdowns during the season and also had 32 receptions for 341 receiving yards and three receiving touchdowns. On November 2, against NC State, he threw a 59-yard passing touchdown to Quinshad Davis in the 27–19 victory. As a sophomore in 2014, he caught 61 passes for 757 yards and four touchdowns. On September 20, against East Carolina, he threw a 35-yard touchdown pass to T. J. Thorpe in the 70–41 loss.

As a junior in 2015, Switzer recorded a team-high 55 receptions for 697 yards and six touchdowns and also returned two punts for scores. In October 2015, a controversial decision by the ACC negated a 70-yard punt return by Switzer, ruling that he had given an "invalid signal" before the return.

In his senior season, Switzer set a school single-season record with 96 receptions for 1,112 yards and scored six touchdowns. He left North Carolina as the career record holder in both receptions and receiving yards.

Collegiate statistics

Professional career

Dallas Cowboys
Switzer was selected by the Dallas Cowboys in the fourth round (133rd overall) in the 2017 NFL Draft. He was the fourth of five North Carolina Tar Heels to be selected that year. A hamstring injury forced him to miss multiple training camp practices and the first two preseason games.

On September 10, 2017, Switzer made his NFL debut in the season opener against the New York Giants. In the game, his role was being the kickoff and punt returner. He fielded two kick returns for 42 net yards and one punt return for no yards. On September 25, against the Arizona Cardinals, he recorded a three-yard rush on the first carry of his career.

On October 1, against the  Los Angeles Rams, he fumbled a punt that the Rams recovered at the Cowboys' 18 yard line and led to a touchdown score five plays later, contributing to a 30-35 loss. On November 30, 2017, Switzer had an 83-yard punt return against the Washington Redskins to score his first career touchdown, and the first Cowboys' punt return touchdown in four years. Outside of the season finale against the Philadelphia Eagles, he was not given much of a chance at wide receiver, finishing with 4 receptions for 32 yards.

He led the team in both punt and kickoff returns. He averaged 8.8 yards per punt return and was ninth-best in the NFL among 20 returners with at least 25 attempts. He averaged 25 yards per kickoff attempt and was third-best in the league among the 10 kick returners with at least 24 attempts.

Oakland Raiders
On April 28, 2018, after the Cowboys acquired Tavon Austin and drafted two wide receivers, Switzer was traded to the Oakland Raiders in exchange for defensive tackle Jihad Ward. He was acquired to be the Oakland Raiders' return specialist, reuniting with Rich Bisaccia who was his special teams coach with the Cowboys.

Pittsburgh Steelers
On August 27, 2018, Switzer was traded to the Pittsburgh Steelers along with a 2019 sixth-round draft pick (#175-Sutton Smith), in exchange for a 2019 fifth-round draft choice (#158-Michael Jackson). During the Steelers' Week 3 win over the Tampa Bay Buccaneers, Switzer recorded his first receiving touchdown as a Steeler on a one-yard reception from Ben Roethlisberger. On November 25, 2018, against the Denver Broncos, Switzer had six receptions for a season-high 67 yards during the loss. He finished the season with 36 receptions for 253 yards, one receiving touchdown, 30	punt returns for 252 yards and 30 kickoff returns for 607 yards.

On November 14, 2019, Switzer was placed on injured reserve with a back injury. On December 26, he was designated for return from injured reserve, and began practicing with the team again, but was not activated as the Steelers failed to make the playoffs. He appeared in 9 games and played only 81 offensive snaps. He registered 8 receptions for 27 yards, 8 punt returns for 29 yards and 9 kickoff returns for 166 yards.

In 2020, he was passed on the depth chart by Ray-Ray McCloud during training camp, and was waived on September 5, 2020.

Cleveland Browns
Switzer was signed to the Cleveland Browns' practice squad on October 1, 2020. He was placed on the practice squad/injured list on November 10, 2020, and restored to the practice squad on December 8, 2020. He was placed on the practice squad/COVID-19 list by the team on December 24, 2020, and restored to the practice squad on December 30.

On January 23, 2021, Switzer signed a reserve/futures contract with the Browns. The Browns placed Switzer on injured reserve on August 16, 2021.

On July 18, 2022, Switzer announced his retirement from the NFL.

See also
 List of NCAA major college football yearly punt and kickoff return leaders

References

External links

North Carolina Tar Heels bio

1994 births
Living people
American football return specialists
American football wide receivers
Dallas Cowboys players
George Washington High School (Charleston, West Virginia) alumni
North Carolina Tar Heels football players
Oakland Raiders players
Pittsburgh Steelers players
Players of American football from West Virginia
Sportspeople from Charleston, West Virginia
Cleveland Browns players